Atanazy Walenty Miączyński h. Suchekomnaty (b. 1639, d. March 1723) was a Polish-Lithuanian nobleman and politician, Treasurer of the Crown Court from 1689.
He was voivode of Volhynia from 1713 and Starosta of Krzepice from 1677 and Lutsk from 1681. He was made a Count of the Holy Roman Empire in 1683.

He participated in several battles, among others at the Battle of Chocim, Battle of Żurawno, Battle of Párkány and the Battle of Vienna.

Marriage and issue

Atanazy married Helena Łuszkowska h. Korczak in 1690. They had six children:

 Antoni Miączyński (1691-1774), married  Princess Dorota Woroniecka h. Korybut (1712–1785)
 Piotr Miączyński (1695-1726), married Antonina Rzewuska
 Kazimierz Miączyński 
 Katarzyna Miączyńska (died 1729), married Franciszek Maksymilian Ossoliński
 Elżbieta Miączyńska (died 1737), married Józef Sierakówski h. Ogończyk
 Józef Miączyński (died ca. 1723)

Bibliography
 Polski Słownik Biograficzny t. 20 p. 553

References

External links
 http://www.wilanow-palac.pl/atanazy_miaczynski_przyjaciel_domu_sobieskich.html
 Fundator Kościoła
 https://web.archive.org/web/20090314140552/http://www.kuria.lublin.pl/parafie/kijany/Zawieprzyce/zawieprzyce.html
 Legenda zawieprzycka

17th-century Polish politicians
18th-century Polish–Lithuanian politicians
Ruthenian nobility of the Polish–Lithuanian Commonwealth
Polish politicians
People from Volyn Oblast
1639 births
1723 deaths